The 14th BARC "200" was a motor race, run to Formula One rules, held on 18 April 1959 at the Aintree Circuit, England. The race was run over 67 laps of the circuit, and was won by French driver Jean Behra in a Ferrari Dino 246.

The field also included many Formula Two cars, highest finisher being Mike Taylor who took fifth place in a Cooper T45.

Results 
''Note: a blue background indicates a car running under Formula 2 regulations.

References 

BARC Aintree 200
BARC Aintree 200
BARC Aintree 200